Byron Ivar Mallott (April 6, 1943 – May 8, 2020) was an American politician, elder, tribal activist and business executive from the state of Alaska. Mallott was an Alaska Native leader of Tlingit heritage and the leader of the Kwaash Ké Kwaan clan. He was the 12th lieutenant governor of Alaska from December 2014 until his resignation on October 16, 2018. He also previously served as the mayor of Yakutat, the mayor of Juneau, the president of the Alaska Federation of Natives and the executive director of the Alaska Permanent Fund.

Mallott was the Democratic nominee for Governor of Alaska in 2014, until he agreed to merge his campaign with that of independent candidate Bill Walker and become Walker's running mate. Walker and Mallott won the election and were sworn in on December 1, 2014. In 2018, Mallott abruptly resigned after it was discovered he made inappropriate overtures to a woman.

Early life

Byron Ivar Mallott was born on April 6, 1943, in Yakutat, Alaska, to Jay B. Mallott and Emma M. Brown. Mallott was an Alaskan Native of the Tlingit tribe. His Tlingit name was Dux̱ da neiḵ, K'oo del ta', which means "'a person who would lead us into the future'". Mallott's father established a general store in a spare room of the family home in 1946. Mallott spent most of his childhood living in Yakutat. As an adult, Mallott recounted that he had attended Pius X Mission, a Catholic boarding school located in Skagway, starting at age 13. He graduated from Sheldon Jackson High School and studied for several years at Western Washington State College.

Career in politics and government
Mallott's political career began in 1965 when his father, who served as Yakutat's mayor for the vast majority of the position's existence, died. He left college and returned to Yakutat, running to replace him, and won the election. He left office before the expiration of his term, taking a job in the office of Governor Bill Egan towards the end of Egan's first governorship. His job in the governor's office was focused on local government affairs, one of the few constitutionally mandated executive functions in Alaska. Mallott was the first Commissioner of the Department of Community and Regional Affairs.

After Egan was defeated for re-election by Walter Hickel in 1966, Mallott returned to Yakutat and served on the city council.

In 1968, Mallott received the Democratic nomination for the 5th district in the Alaska House of Representatives. In the general election he was narrowly defeated by Henry E. Reeves by twenty-three votes. Mallott posted the $250 for a recount, but the vote total remained the same. In 1969, Senator Mike Gravel appointed him to serve as a special assistant.

Mallott became chairman of Alaska's Reapportionment Board. On September 5, 1980, he resigned from the board for personal reasons.

In 1982, Mallott was appointed to the board of trustees of the Alaska Permanent Fund Corporation by Governor Jay Hammond to replace Elmer Rasmuson. In 1985, he was selected to serve as the chairman of the permanent fund; he later served as its executive director from 1995 to 2000.

Mayor of Juneau

Incumbent mayor Jamie Parsons declined to seek re-election in 1994 after one term in office. On August 16, 1994, Mallott announced that he would run in Juneau's mayoral election. He was elected mayor of Juneau in that municipality's 1994 general election. He resigned from office after he was selected to serve as the executive director of the Alaska Permanent Fund Corporation. Mallott faced harsh criticism when he initially announced that he could handle serving in both positions, leading to changing his mind and resigning the mayoral position. Mallott was succeeded as mayor by deputy mayor Dennis Egan.

Lieutenant Governor of Alaska

2014 election

Mallott announced on September 2, 2013 that he was running for the Democratic nomination for governor of Alaska in the 2014 election. He won the Democratic gubernatorial primary with 80% of the vote on August 19, 2014.

Independent candidate Bill Walker and Mallott merged their campaigns on September 2 to appear on the November ballot as one independent campaign, which the Alaska Democratic Party endorsed. On this ticket, Walker ran for governor with Mallott as his running mate. Both candidates' respective prior running mates withdrew. They won the election on November 4, 2014, as there was a recount due to a close election result.

2018 election

In 2017, Walker and Mallott registered to run for re-election on an independent ticket. Despite running for reelection as an independent, Mallott maintained his Democratic Party registration. Walker and Mallott faced a Republican ticket headed by state senator Mike Dunleavy and a Democratic ticket headed by former senator Mark Begich. Mallott resigned from office on October 16, and Walker—after briefly continuing his campaign with newly appointed Lieutenant Governor Valerie Davidson as his running mate–suspended his campaign on October 19.

Tenure
Mallott signed state marijuana regulations into effect in January 2016. In 2016, Raven Radio reported that Mallott had logged 280,000 Alaska Air Miles in the first two years of his tenure as lieutenant governor.

Mallott resigned his post as lieutenant governor on October 16, 2018, citing "inappropriate comments" that he had made to a woman whom Governor Walker refused to name. He was succeeded as lieutenant governor by Valerie Davidson, the former commissioner of the Alaska Department of Health and Social Services.

Business career
In 1972, Mallott became a member of the newly formed Sealaska Corporation and was elected director. He served as chairman of the board from 1976 to 1983. In 1982, he was selected to serve as the CEO and kept his position until retirement on July 1, 1992. He also established a permanent fund for Sealaska shareholders. The fund had grown to a net worth of $100 million by the late 1990s. Mallott served on the board of Sealaska until 2014.

Mallott was also a founding director of the Alaska Commercial Fisheries and Agriculture Bank. He was also a director of the Seattle Branch Board of Directors of the Federal Reserve Bank of San Francisco, and he served on the board of directors of the Federal Reserve Bank of San Francisco. He served as a director of Alaska Air Group and served on the board of the National Alliance of Business.

Other community involvement
Mallott was a clan leader of the KwaashKiKwaan clan of the Raven tribe of Yakutat. He served as President of the Alaska Federation of Natives (AFN) and received a "Citizen of the Year" award from AFN. Mallott served as president and CEO of the First Alaskans Foundation.

Mallott was appointed by Governor Tony Knowles as a co-chair of the Alaska Commission on Rural Governance and Empowerment. He also chaired the Nature Conservancy of Alaska and served as a director of the Alaska Public Radio Network.

Personal life and death
Mallott was married to Antoinette (Toni) Mallott, a retired schoolteacher who spent most of her career teaching elementary grades in the Juneau School District. They had five children. The Mallotts lived in the West Juneau neighborhood of Juneau, located on Douglas Island near downtown Juneau.

Mallott suffered a heart attack at his home in Juneau on May 7, 2020, and was flown by a medical charter to Anchorage. He died the following day at the age of 77.

Electoral history

See also 
 List of minority governors and lieutenant governors in the United States

References

External links

 

|-

|-

|-

|-

1943 births
2020 deaths
20th-century American politicians
21st-century American politicians
20th-century Native Americans
21st-century Native Americans
Alaska city council members
Alaska Democrats
Alaska Independents
Alaska Native people
American chief executives
Businesspeople from Alaska
Lieutenant Governors of Alaska
Mayors of Juneau, Alaska
Native American city councillors
Native American mayors
State cabinet secretaries of Alaska
Tlingit people
University of Alaska regents
Western Washington University alumni
Yakutat City and Borough, Alaska